Mito Station is the name of multiple train stations in Japan.

 Mito Station (Ibaraki) - (水戸駅) in Ibaraki Prefecture
 Mito Station (Osaka) - (弥刀駅) in Osaka Prefecture